Weitnauer is a surname, derived from the Bavarian town of Weitnau. Notable people with this name include:

 (1916–1984), Swiss diplomat
 (1905–1974), German writer and historian
 (1910–1999), German jurist
Jürg Weitnauer (born 1955), Swiss rower
Mary Ann Weitnauer, American electrical engineer
 (born 1954), German jurist